Edmondo Cirielli (born 22 May 1964) is an Italian politician and Colonel of Carabinieri. He is a deputy of the Italian Chamber of Deputies since 2001, and has previously served as President of the Province of Salerno from 2009 to 2012.

References 

Deputies of Legislature XIV of Italy
Deputies of Legislature XV of Italy
Deputies of Legislature XVI of Italy
Deputies of Legislature XVII of Italy
Deputies of Legislature XVIII of Italy
Italian Social Movement politicians
National Alliance (Italy) politicians
The People of Freedom politicians
Brothers of Italy politicians
21st-century Italian politicians
Presidents of the Province of Salerno
Living people
1963 births